Ronaldo De Jesús Prieto Ramírez (born 3 March 1997) is a Mexican professional footballer who plays as a midfielder for Liga MX club Santos Laguna.

Career statistics

Club

References

1997 births
Living people
Association football defenders
Mexican footballers
C.D. Veracruz footballers
Albinegros de Orizaba footballers
Tampico Madero F.C. footballers
Santos Laguna footballers
Liga MX players
Ascenso MX players
Footballers from Veracruz
People from Santiago Tuxtla